The 17405 / 17406 Krishna Express also known as Sree Krishna Express, is an intercity express train running between  of Andhra Pradesh and Adilabad of Telangana. It belongs to South Central Railways Secunderabad of Indian Railways and it takes 24 hours and 50 minutes to cover  between its nodal stations.

Schedule
17405 Krishna Express starts from Tirupati at 5:25 a.m. and arrives Adilabad on next day 6:15 a.m. Similarly 17406 Krishna Express starts from Adilabad at 20:45 p.m. and arrives Tirupati on next day 21:15 p.m.
Passengers need to be extremely cautious and careful while getting into this Train in Vijayawada (Bejawada Junction), as you can see 2 Krishna Expresses going in opposite directions at the same time. Passengers need to study, review, analyze, assess and conclude, then climb into the Krishna Express that goes into the direction that hopefully takes the passengers to their correct destination. They can sometime review the engine direction.

Etymology 
The train is named after the Krishna River which flows from the city of Vijayawada and the train was first started from there itself. Then, it was extended up to Hyderabad Decan, as an early morning Day Train. Later, it was extended up to Secunderabad and Nizamabad and now up to Adilabad. It was extended up to Tirupathi on the other side.

Krishna express is also known as Sree Krishna Express after this Indian God.

Route & Halts 

Traction
It is hauled by a Krishnarajapuram-based WDP-4 / WDP-4D locomotive from ADB till SC, from SC till TPTY it is hauled by a Lallaguda-based WAP-7 locomotive and vice versa.

Direction reversal  
This train reverses direction at  & .

Rake sharing  
This train shares the rake with Adilabad–Hazur Sahib Nanded Express.

References 

Transport in Adilabad
Transport in Tirupati
Railway services introduced in 1974
Named passenger trains of India
Express trains in India